Live at Baker's Keyboard Lounge is a live album by saxophonist James Carter with guests David Murray, Johnny Griffin and Franz Jackson recorded at Baker's Keyboard Lounge in 2001, and released on the Warner Bros. label in 2004.

Reception

Reviewing for The Village Voice in July 2004, Tom Hull said that "this isn't a great album, but it's voluble and exciting the way Carter can be."

The Allmusic review by Al Campbell says, "Live at Baker's Keyboard Lounge finds Carter cutting loose like a musician who's been conceptually sidetracked long enough. This is a back to basics blowing session and concepts be damned". In JazzTimes Chris Kelsey called the album "a rollicking session that captures the loose vibe of a nightclub set to near perfection". On All About Jazz Russ Musto noted, "James Carter is a passionate player whose solos are frequently pushed over the top by his awesome virtuosity. That tendency is put to good use on this live extravaganza recorded before a raucous crowd at Baker's Keyboard Lounge. ... Carter moves effortlessly through his arsenal of saxophones on an exciting program of jazz classics".

Track listing
 "Tricotism" (Oscar Pettiford) – 9:23
 "Soul Street" (Jimmy Forrest) – 8:17
 "Freedom Jazz Dance" (Eddie Harris) – 9:26
 "I Can't Get Started" (Vernon Duke, Ira Gershwin) – 7:10
 "Free and Easy" (Don Byas) – 10:39
 "Low Flame" (Leonard Feather) – 10:21
 "Sack Full of Dreams" (Gary McFarland) – 12:00
 "Foot Pattin'" (George Duvivier) – 11:29

Personnel
James Carter – tenor saxophone soprano saxophone, baritone saxophone
Gerard Gibbs – organ
Leonard King – drums
David Murray, Johnny Griffin – tenor saxophone
Franz Jackson – tenor saxophone, vocals
Larry Smith – alto saxophone
Dwight Adams – trumpet
Kenny Cox – piano
Ralphe Armstrong – bass
Richard "Pistol" Allen – drums

References 

2004 live albums
James Carter (musician) live albums
Warner Records live albums
Albums produced by Ahmet Ertegun